This is a list of tributaries of Wheeling Creek, a tributary of the Ohio River in northern West Virginia in the United States.  The creek's watershed also extends into southwestern Pennsylvania.  The list is ordered upstream from Wheeling Creek's mouth in Wheeling.

List of tributaries from West to East
Wheeling Creek - Ohio County, West Virginia
Long Run
Waddles Run
Pogues Run
Carter Run
Little Wheeling Creek   - near Elm Grove, West Virginia
Peters Run
Browns Run
Warden Run
Middle Wheeling Creek    - near Triadelphia, West Virginia
Tanyard Run
Middle Creek Dam
Gillespie Run
Marlow Run
Orrs Run
Hall Run
Laidley Run
Coulter Run
Todd Run
McCoy Run
Gashell Run
Point Run
Roneys Point Run
Dixon Run
Battle Run
McGraw Run
Jakes Run - Marshall County, West Virginia
Bull Run
Britt Run
Seabright Hollow
Grandstaff Run
Wherry Run
Cricket Hollow
Hollidays Run
Bald Eagle Hollow
Bruce Run
Burch Run
Big Run
Still Run
Turkey Run
Wolf Run
Granny Run
Howard Run
Williams Run
Bee Tree Run
Greathouse Hollow
Browns Run
Dunkard Fork    - near Majorsville, West Virginia
Stone Coal Run
Wharton Run
Chaney Run
Crabapple Creek
North Fork of Dunkard Fork  
Ryerson Station Reservoir
Polly Hollow
Kent Run
Polen Run
Long Run
Whitehorn Run
Webster Run
Job Creek
Falling Timber Run
South Fork of Dunkard Fork  
Borney's Run
Strawn Hollow
Mudlick Fork
Hewitt Run
Chambers Run
Blacks Creek
Enlow Fork    - near Majorsville, West Virginia
Spottedtail Run
Robinson Fork  
Beham Run
Blockhouse Run
Owens Run
Templeton Fork
Rocky Run
Long Run
Boothe Run

Wheeling Creek watershed graph

See also
 
List of rivers of West Virginia
List of rivers of Pennsylvania

Wheeling Creek Tributaries
Wheeling
T
Wheeling Creek